Nyírbátor is a town in Szabolcs-Szatmár-Bereg county, in the Northern Great Plain region of eastern Hungary. With its historic atmosphere, this city is known for its 15th- and 16th-century ecclesiastic and secular architectural heritage and for the Báthory family, former landowners.

Geography

History

The first written record of the settlement dates from 1279. Its name stems from the Old Turkish word 'batir' or Mongolian 'bator' (originally meaning a 'good hero', and corresponding to 'bátor' in modern Hungarian). At that time, the ancestors of the Báthorys, the Gutkeled clan, already owned the land. The town became the administrative centre of their estates and also the family burial site. The family owned the town until the death of Gabriel Báthory, Prince of Transylvania in 1613.

The town was of great significance in Hungarian history during the 16th century. In 1549, the legates of King Ferdinand I and of Isabella agreed to return Transylvania to the Kingdom of Hungary. During the decades that followed there was a lasting dispute as to whom the town belonged since the local aristocrats were more inclined to recognise the sovereignty of the ruling prince of Transylvania.

By the 18th century the town had become impoverished. In the course of the 1872 reorganisation of public administration it lost its city rights that were returned only in 1973.

Sights
Numerous heritage buildings have remained from the town's heyday. The best known is what is now the Reformed Church. Built between 1488 and 1511, it is one of the most beautiful International Gothic structures in Hungary. The late Renaissance-style belfry next to it is the largest wooden bell tower in the country.

Franciscan friars built their friary church around 1480 in a late Gothic style. Its altars and its pulpit are among the most beautifully carved Baroque works in the country. Standing near the church is the building which now houses the István Báthori Museum. Originally a Baroque Minorite friary, it was built on the site of an earlier monastery.

Sport
The association football club, Nyírbátori FC, is based in Nyírbátor.

Photo gallery

Notable people
Elizabeth Bathory (1560–1614), Hungarian countess and, allegedly, the most prolific female serial killer in history
 Meshulam Gross (1863–1947), Hungarian-American entrepreneur

Twin towns – sister cities

Nyírbátor is twinned with:

 Carei, Romania
 Khust, Ukraine
 Rawa Mazowiecka, Poland
 Șimleu Silvaniei, Romania
 Vynohradiv, Ukraine

See also
 Wooden Belfry of Nyírbátor

References

External links 

  in Hungarian, English and German

Populated places in Szabolcs-Szatmár-Bereg County
Gothic architecture in Hungary